The 1948 United States presidential election in New Mexico took place on November 2, 1948. All 48 states were part of the 1948 United States presidential election. State voters chose four electors to represent them in the Electoral College, which voted for President and Vice President.

New Mexico was won by incumbent President Harry S. Truman, who took the Oval Office after the death of President Franklin D. Roosevelt. Running against Truman was Governor of New York Thomas E. Dewey, who was strongly predicted to win the contest. Dixiecrat candidate Strom Thurmond took portions of the South, but was not even on the ballot in New Mexico and other Western states.

, this is the last election in which Union County and Harding County voted for a Democratic presidential candidate and the last until 2020 in which Valencia County voted for a losing candidate.

Results

Results by county

References

New Mexico
1948 New Mexico elections
1948